Lamivudine/raltegravir, sold under the brand name Dutrebis, is a fixed-dose combination antiretroviral medication used in the treatment of HIV/AIDS. It contains lamivudine and raltegravir. It is taken by mouth. Side effects may include lactic acidosis, pancreatitis, liver failure, and severe skin rashes. It was approved for medical use in the United States in 2015.

Lamivudine/raltegravir is not available in the United States.

References

External links
 

Antiretroviral drugs
Fixed dose combination (antiretroviral)
HIV/AIDS
Merck & Co. brands